Gap Band VII is the ninth album by the Gap Band, released in 1985 on Total Experience Records. The album includes the single from original Jerry Peters's song "Going in Circles". As AllMusic's Amy Hanson said in her review of the album, "The band was quickly back to business across the eminently catchy tunes "Automatic Brain" and "Ooh, What a Feeling," leaving both "L'il Red Funkin' Hood" and "Bumpin' Gum People," which features funkier vocals than listeners had heard from the band in quite some time, to round out the set with some good-old Gap Band sonics. Elsewhere, the band pulled a quiet storm trick out of their bag on 'I Know We'll Make It'."
 
An expanded and remastered version of the album was released on April 29, 2013, by Big Break Records with six additional tracks.

Track listing

(*) Bonus tracks on the remastered version

Charts

Weekly charts

Year-end charts

References

External links
 Gap Band VII at Discogs
 Facebook Page
 Myspace Page
 Encyclopedia of Oklahoma History and Culture - Gap Band
 The Gap Band at WhoSampled
 Charlie Wilson in-depth interview by Pete Lewis, 'Blues & Soul' August 2011
 Charlie Wilson 2011 Interview at Soulinterviews.com

1985 albums
The Gap Band albums
Total Experience Records albums